{{DISPLAYTITLE:C25H25O12}}
The molecular formula C25H25O12 (molar mass: 517.45 g/mol, exact mass: 517.1341 u) may refer to:

 Vitisin B (pyranoanthocyanin)

Molecular formulas